David Bingham may refer to:

David Bingham (Scottish footballer) (born 1970), Scottish association football player and manager
David Bingham (American soccer) (born 1989), American soccer goalkeeper
David Bingham (sailor) (born 1939), Australian Olympic sailor
David Bingham (engineer), co-founder of semiconductor manufacturer Maxim Integrated